

Mountains in Brazil

See also
List of tunnels in Brazil

Notes

Brazil
Mountains
Brazil